Arthrosaura synaptolepis is a species of lizard in the family Gymnophthalmidae. It is found on granite mountains in tropical forests in Venezuela and Brazil. It is also known as Donneisy's Arthrosaura.

References

Arthrosaura
Reptiles described in 1992
Taxa named by Maureen Ann Donnelly
Taxa named by Roy Wallace McDiarmid
Taxa named by Charles W. Myers